GIDC can refer to:
 Gujarat Industrial Development Corporation
 Gender identity disorder in children